20010101 is the third compilation album by J-pop duo Two-Mix, released by King Records on January 1, 2001. The four-disc album covers the duo's singles, B-sides, and other tracks from 1995 to 1998. At the time, it was considered to be an unofficial release, as the duo had left King Records in 1998. The album has since been listed as an official compilation following the release of the 2002 box set Two-Mix Collection Box: Categorhythm.

The album peaked at No. 84 on Oricon's weekly albums chart.

Track listing 
All lyrics are written by Shiina Nagano; all music is composed by Minami Takayama, except where indicated; all music is arranged by Two-Mix.

Charts

References

External links 
 
 

2001 compilation albums
Two-Mix compilation albums
Japanese-language compilation albums
King Records (Japan) compilation albums